Henry Whitfield (25 February 1903 – 14 January 1937) was an Australian cricketer. He played in twenty-five first-class matches for South Australia between 1926 and 1932.

See also
 List of South Australian representative cricketers

References

External links
 

1903 births
1937 deaths
Australian cricketers
South Australia cricketers
Cricketers from Adelaide